Technopark or Technoparc may refer to:

 Technopark Zürich, Zürich, Canton of Zürich, Switzerland
 South Bank Technopark, London South Bank University, England
 Casablanca Technopark, Morocco
 Technopark, Trivandrum, at Thiruvananthapuram, Kerala, India
 Technopark Stellenbosch, Stellenbosch, South Africa
 Tekhnopark (Moscow Metro), a station of the Zamoskvoretskaya Line of the Moscow Metro
 Technoparc Montreal, an industrial park in the Montreal west island
 Parc d'entreprises de la Pointe-Saint-Charles, an industrial park in Montreal, formerly known as Montreal Technoparc
 Elgazala Technopark, the first technopark in Tunisia
 Technopark Station, a subway station on Line 1 of the Incheon Subway
 Technoparc station, a planned Réseau électrique métropolitain station